Santtu Kinnunen (born 25 March 1999) is a Finnish professional ice hockey defenceman who is currently playing with the Charlotte Checkers in the American Hockey League (AHL) as a prospect under contract with the Florida Panthers of the National Hockey League (NHL).

Playing career
Kinnunen played as a youth within the Lahti Pelicans organization before making his professional debut with second tier affiliate, Peliitat Heinola, during the 2017–18 season. Showing promising development on the blueline, Kinnunen was selected by the Florida Panthers in the seventh-round, 207th overall, of the 2018 NHL Entry Draft.

He made his debut in the Liiga with 27 appearances for Lahti Pelicans during the 2018–19 Liiga season.

Kinnunen played two full seasons with Tappara before he was signed to a two-year, entry-level contract with draft club, the Florida Panthers, on 2 May 2022.

In moving to North America, Kinnunen featured in his first training camp with the Panthers in 2022, before he was re-assigned to begin the 2022–23 season with AHL affiliate, the Charlotte Checkers, on 2 October 2022.

Career statistics

References

External links
 

1999 births
Living people
Charlotte Checkers (2010–) players
Florida Panthers draft picks
Lahti Pelicans players
Finnish ice hockey defencemen
Sportspeople from Lahti
Peliitat Heinola players
Tappara players
21st-century Finnish people